Ropecon is a role-playing convention held annually in Finland. The convention is one of the largest non-commercial annual events of its kind, having reached a record of "over 5900" attendees in 2022. The current venue is the Messukeskus Helsinki convention centre in Helsinki, the capital city of Finland.

Ropecon hosts a wide variety of different types of games, including role-playing games, live action role-playing games, collectible card games, miniature wargames and strategy games. The event also has a range of lectures, panel discussions and other presentations covering different aspects of gaming. Past guests of honor have included several prominent game designers, such as Steve Jackson.

Ropecon is organised by the Ropecon Society, a joint venture of several Finnish role-playing associations. The practical arrangements are made by the unpaid members of an organising committee and hundreds of voluntary workers at the convention. Any profits are used to support various other role-playing activities.

The name "Ropecon" comes from the Finnish language word "roolipeli", meaning role-playing game, but is also a nod to the English language word "rope", a vital piece of equipment in classic dungeon crawl role-playing games.

The Finnish culture ministry supported Ropecon in 2013 with funding.

The 2020 and 2021 conventions were turned into online events because of the worldwide COVID-19 pandemic.

List of Ropecons

References

External links
 Official website of Ropecon

Gaming conventions
Role-playing conventions
Entertainment events in Finland
Recurring events established in 1994
1994 establishments in Finland
Annual events in Finland